Gumira is a village in the Chipinge district of  Manicaland, Zimbabwe, halfway between Chipinge and Chiredzi.  The village has an abundance of water for possible irrigation from the Save River and very fertile soils.

There is a primary school (Gumira Primary School) and a clinic (Gumira Clinic), along with some stores, including the Mandhlaami Bottle Store.

Populated places in Manicaland Province